This is a list of people from Brașov, Romania.

Violeta Andrei
Lajos Áprily
Teodor Axentowicz
Liviu Cornel Babeș
Ștefan Baciu
Maria Baiulescu
Bálint Bakfark
Stephan Bergler
Ilie Birt
Marcian Bleahu
Gheorghe Bogdan-Duică
Friedrich von Bömches
Brassaï
Mihai Brediceanu
Marius Brenciu
Ștefan Câlția
Henri Catargi
Tudor Ciortea
Coresi
Doina Cornea
Melania Cristescu
Dorin Dănilă
Margarete Depner

Delia Duca

Rudolf Fischer
Alexandru Emanoil Florescu
Gheorghe Marin Fontanin
Elena Gaja
Teodora Gheorghiu
Gustav Gräser
Valentin Greissing

Johannes Honter
Ștefan Octavian Iosif
József Koszta
Constantin Lecca
Aleksandar Lifka
Peter Maffay
George Marinescu
Hans Mattis-Teutsch
Ioan Meșotă
Friedrich Miess
 Gabriela and Mihaela Modorcea, twin sisters comprising the duo Indiggo
Lula Mysz-Gmeiner
Liviu-Dieter Nisipeanu
Mișu Popp
Dumitru Prunariu
Sextil Pușcariu
Laura Taler 
Nicolae Teclu
Christian Tell
Ion Țiriac
Vladimir Tismăneanu
Adele Zay

See also
 List of mayors of Brașov

 
Brasov